Buyda (Böyźö) is a rural locality (a selo) and the administrative centre of Buydinsky Selsoviet, Uchalinsky District, Bashkortostan, Russia. The population was 764 as of 2010. There are 12 streets.

Geography 
Buyda is located 15 km southeast of Uchaly (the district's administrative centre) by road. Uchaly-2 is the nearest rural locality.

References 

Rural localities in Uchalinsky District